Awami Jamhuri Ittehad Pakistan was a political party in Swabi District, Khyber Pakhtunkhwa, Pakistan. This political party was established by Liaqat Khan Tarakai and was headed by his son Shahram Khan who merged it into Imran Khan 's PTI.

Awami Jamhuri Ittehad Pakistan  (AJIP) was founded by his father Liaqat Khan. He was the chairman of this party. It has since merged into Imran Khan's Pakistan Tehreek-e-Insaf.

Electoral history

References

Social democratic parties in Pakistan
2012 establishments in Pakistan
Political parties established in 2012
Pakistan Tehreek-e-Insaf